Partha Niyogi (July 31, 1967 – October 1, 2010) was the Louis Block Professor in Computer Science and Statistics at the University of Chicago. 
He is known for his work in artificial intelligence, especially in the field of manifold learning and evolutionary linguistics. He wrote more than 90 academic publications and two books.

Notable work
Laplacian eigenmaps

References

External links
  Personal website
  Technical Reports

1967 births
2010 deaths
Computer scientists
University of Chicago faculty